Walpurgisnacht Ballet is a ballet made by New York City Ballet's co-founder and founding choreographer George Balanchine for a 1975 production of Gounod's 1859 Faust at the Théâtre National de l'Opéra, Paris, including Gounod's additional ballet music from 1869. The New York City Ballet premiere was the first presentation of the dance as an independent work, on Thursday, 15 May 1980 at the New York State Theater, Lincoln Center. Balanchine had previously made dances for productions of Faust at the Opéra de Monte-Carlo, danced by Diaghilev's Ballets Russes; in 1935 for the Metropolitan Opera; and 1945 for the Opera Nacional, Mexico City.

Walpurgisnacht is found at the beginning of the last act of Faust. Mephistopheles shows Faust the folk celebration before May Day, when the souls of the dead are released briefly to wander as they will. The ballet does not directly depict the Walpurgis Night but builds on a sense of joyful revelry.

Casts

Original 

    
 Paris Opéra Ballet

NYCB 

   
 Suzanne Farrell
 Heather Watts
 Stephanie Saland
 Judith Fugate
 Kyra Nichols
 
 Adam Lüders
 Ben Huys

Reviews 

  
Sunday NY Times by John Martin, 24 August 1947

Sunday NY Times by Anna Kisselgoff, 18 May 1980
NY Times by Alastair MacAulay, 1 June 2010

External links 
Walpurgisnacht Ballet on the Balanchine Trust website

1975 ballet premieres
Ballets to the music of Charles Gounod
Ballets by George Balanchine
New York City Ballet repertory
Walpurgis Night fiction